Vincent Gallo (born April 11, 1962) is an American actor, director, writer, producer, and musician. He has won several accolades, including a Volpi Cup for Best Actor, and been nominated for numerous more, including a Palme d'Or and Golden Lion.

As an actor, Gallo has appeared in films including Arizona Dream (1993), The House of the Spirits (1993), Palookaville (1995), The Funeral (1996), Tetro (2009), and Essential Killing (2010). As a filmmaker, Gallo is most associated with the independent films he has made, including Buffalo '66 (1998) and The Brown Bunny (2003). He also directed and wrote Promises Written in Water (2010), a Golden Lion nominated film, which was only ever screened twice publicly, and is now unavailable to watch.

In the early 2000s, Gallo also released several solo recordings on Warp Records.

Early life
Gallo was born on April 11, 1962, in Buffalo, New York to Sicilian parents. Both of Gallo's parents were hairdressers, and his father retired to be "a gambler." He has described his parents as dishonest people, saying "If it was my birthday, I knew my mother took me to the K-Mart and she stole my toy. She'd put it in the shopping cart and we'd walk out. I was raised with that."

According to Gallo, during his teenage years, he was picked up by the police "at least six times" for minor crimes like shoplifting, fighting, or being caught in a stolen vehicle. Gallo's father was abusive and beat him on several occasions, including one instance where Gallo's father broke his nose. Gallo's mother also did not allow him to decorate his own room, and forbade him from owning a guitar, leading Gallo to secretly hide one underneath his bed. Gallo left school and his home at the age of 16, and took up various jobs. He went on to race motorbikes professionally, without training, and later become a successful painter.

Film career

During Gallo's artistic period in the 1980s, when he worked as a musician and painter in New York City, he also began experimenting with film. He made the short film "If You Feel Froggy, Jump" and appeared in the 1981 film Downtown 81 with painter Jean-Michel Basquiat. In 1984, Gallo acted in The Way It Is (1985) by Eric Mitchell, which included actors Steve Buscemi and Rockets Redglare. After starring in the obscure 1989 film Doc's Kingdom, he began acting in small parts in more well-known films such as Goodfellas, The House of the Spirits, and The Perez Family. French director Claire Denis hired Gallo to act in several films such as the short film Keep It for Yourself, the made-for-TV U.S. Go Home, and its follow-up feature Nénette et Boni (1996)." Gallo was considered and almost cast as Uncle Rico in the 2004 film Napoleon Dynamite, though the role ultimately went to Jon Gries.

In 2010, Gallo won the Volpi Cup for Best Actor at the 67th Venice International Film Festival for his role in Essential Killing, although he did not have a line in the film. He did not attend the ceremony to accept his award in person, leaving the duty to the film's director Jerzy Skolimowski, who tried to get the actor to reveal himself, leading the audience in a chant of his name. Gallo was not in attendance.

Gallo stars in Davide Manuli's La leggenda di Kaspar Hauser, a modern-western interpretation of the German legend of Kaspar Hauser which premiered at the 2012 International Film Festival Rotterdam. Gallo plays the two largest roles in the film, the English-speaking Sheriff and the Italian-speaking assassin.

He co-starred with Kōichi Satō and Yoo Ji-tae in Junji Sakamoto's 2013 film, Human Trust.

In 2022, Gallo appeared in Shut In, his first acting role since 2013.

Buffalo '66 (1998)

In 1998, Gallo had his directorial debut film, Buffalo '66, which was nominated for an award for "Best First Feature" at the Independent Spirit Awards. Gallo made this drama for $1.5 million, serving as writer, director, lead actor, and composer/performer of the soundtrack. The release of Buffalo '66 "gained him a solid fan base."

Gallo had difficulties working with actress Christina Ricci, who starred in the film alongside him. According to Ricci, Gallo was a "crazy lunatic man" and did not get alongside her on the set. Ricci also said that Gallo mocked her weight several years after the film released, and that she has no interest in ever seeing his other films. 

Gallo disputes Ricci's account, and in 2018, wrote "I still smile when I see a picture of her and when she insults me in the press it reminds me that we are connected in some way, and for that I am grateful. Christina Ricci was my friend during the filming of Buffalo 66 and working with her made sense and felt natural....I insulted her jokingly one day to a friend and a sneaky gossip writer overheard me. Christina and I have not spoken since."

The Brown Bunny (2003)

In 2003, Gallo starred in and directed the film The Brown Bunny, which chronicles a motorcycle racer's cross-country road trip and co-starred Chloë Sevigny. The film, which contained a scene of Sevigny performing unsimulated oral sex upon Gallo, received an overwhelmingly negative critical response to its Cannes premiere and became a media scandal, in part due to Gallo's use of a still image from a sex scene on a promotional billboard. In part, the critical response discussed whether Sevigny had been pressured into performing a sex act by Gallo. According to Andrea LeVasseur of Allmovie, The Brown Bunny "premiered to much derision at the 2003 Cannes Film Festival." Film critic Roger Ebert stated that The Brown Bunny was the worst film in the history of Cannes. Gallo retorted by calling Ebert a "fat pig with the physique of a slave trader" and put a hex on Ebert, wishing him colon cancer. Ebert then responded – paraphrasing a statement made by Winston Churchill – that, "although I am fat, one day I will be thin, but Mr. Gallo will still have been the director of The Brown Bunny." In 2003, several media sources later reported that Gallo apologized to Ebert, but Gallo disputed this, saying "I never apologized for anything in my life...The only thing I am sorry about is putting a curse on Roger Ebert's colon. If a fat pig like Roger Ebert doesn't like my movie then I'm sorry for him."

In 2004, Gallo and Ebert appeared to have reconciled, and Ebert ended up giving a thumbs up to a re-edited version of The Brown Bunny. However, in a 2018 article, written after Ebert's death, Gallo accused Ebert's review of the re-edited version as being "far fetched and an outright lie."

Promises Written in Water (2010)

In 2010, Gallo's Promises Written in Water was shown at the 67th Venice International Film Festival and the 2010 Toronto International Film Festival. The film received mixed reviews, and has only ever been seen at the two festivals. The film was nominated for the Golden Lion.

Gallo has stated that he has no plans to ever distribute the film and allow it to be seen again, as "I do not want my new works to be generated in a market or audience of any kind." He also added that allowing the film only ever being shown at two screenings was part of a deal he made with Delfine Bafort, who starred in the film. Gallo explained in a 2011 interview that the film would be "allowed to rest in peace, and stored without being exposed to the dark energies from the public."

As of 2023, the film is not available to watch, and has not been screened since 2010.

Other projects
In 2013, Gallo's website listed that he had directed, written, produced, and acted in his fourth feature film, April. It states that the film is 88 minutes long, stars Gallo as the lead character Seth Goldstone, and co-stars pornographic actor Jamie Gillis. The film has never been released, leading to speculation about the nature of the project.

Gallo has also created numerous short films, including The Agent, which was nominated for Best Short Film at the 67th Venice International Film Festival.

Music career

Gallo played electric bass and sang in the mid-1970s in several adolescent garage bands such as Blue Mood; a progressive rock cover band named Zephyr (not to be confused with the late 1960s band of the same name, or the 1980s Johnny Goudie-fronted band of the same name) which did one performance at Lincoln Park, Tonawanda, New York in 1978; The Good (with Bernie Kugel and Larry Galanowitz); The Detours; and the Plastics. At the age of 16, Gallo moved to New York City and was a later member of the band Gray, with visual artist Jean-Michel Basquiat. Gray played at clubs such as Max's Kansas City, CBGB's, Hurrahs, and the Mudd Club. A few of Gray's recordings appear on the soundtrack for the film Downtown 81.

Gallo played in a band called Bohack, which recorded an album entitled It Took Several Wives. When Bohack disbanded, Gallo turned his attention to acting, directing, and composing in films. He wrote songs for the soundtrack of the 1998 film Buffalo 66. He played in a rock band with Lukas Haas called Bunny, and Gallo put out his own album which he wrote, performed and produced under Warp Records, titled When.

On August 3, 2013, Vincent Gallo headlined the 3rd Annual San Frandelic Summer Fest in San Francisco.

Music videos
Gallo directed music videos for the songs "Going Inside" by John Frusciante, and "Anemone" by L'Arc-en-Ciel. He also starred in the music videos for "Bitter" by Lit, "Cosmopolitan Bloodloss" by Glassjaw, and "Grounded" by My Vitriol.

Gallo also appeared as a model in H&M Spring 2009 Collection alongside Eva Herzigova.

Other work and appearances
In 1984, he (using the name "Prince Vince") appeared as a dancer on an unsold TV pilot for a hip-hop dance show called Graffiti Rock.

He makes a fictionalized appearance in Caspar Vega's 2012 book The Eclectic Prince.

Gallo did a fashion campaign and photo shoot with G-Star Raw jeans in Fall 2011.

Personal life
Gallo lives in Arizona. He is a teetotaler. In 1984, Gallo was married to a woman for just 10 weeks, before their relationship ended.

Gallo is a Republican, and appeared in the 2004 documentary, Rated R: Republicans in Hollywood. In a 2018 open letter, published in the magazine Another Man, Gallo expressed his support for President Donald Trump. In 2022, he also praised then-Democratic Senator Kyrsten Sinema as "open minded and thoughtful".

Public reception
Gallo's work has been praised by many filmmakers and actors including Jean-Luc Goddard, John Waters, Werner Herzog, and Sean Penn. Actor Robert Pattinson has also cited Gallo's performance in Arizona Dream as one of his early influences. 

Filmmaker Francis Ford Coppola stated that while working with Gallo in Tetro, he found that Gallo "was very intelligent and a pleasure to work with." Actress Chloë Sevigny has also stated that she "love[s] Vincent". Actress Courteney Cox has said that she initially "had a really bad experience" working with Gallo, but after filming alongside him a second time, changed her opinion, explaining that Gallo was previously "going through a bad time in his life" and was now "fantastic". Conversely, actress Christina Ricci described her experience with Gallo as "working with a crazy lunatic man", and vowed to never work with him again. 

Entertainment Weekly has described Gallo as "rapturous, hilarious, and notoriously acerbic", while The Guardian has called him a "narcissistic, fantastic director". The Guardian also wrote that Gallo "has a reputation as not only one of the most paranoid, controlling men in movies, but also one of the funniest."

Filmography

Feature films
Directional works

Acting performances

Documentary appearance

Television

Short films

 If You Feel Froggy, Jump (1980)
 Wedding (1986)
 The Gun Lover (1986)
 That Smell (1988)
 Gallo 2000 (1989)
 Casting Director Billy Hopkins Leaves a Message for Vincent Gallo (1994)
 Buffalo 66 Trailer (1997)
 Vincent Gallo Has a Thing or Two to Say About the British (1997)
 Vincent Gallo Directs (1997)
 Looking for Enemies Finding Friends (1997)
 Live Love Drive (1999)
 Anemone (2000)
 Honey Bunny (2001)
 John Frusciante Plays and Sings (2001)
 The Brown Bunny Trailers (2003)
 The Curse of Manuel Chiche (2003)
 Akiko (2004)
 The Agent (2010)
 Anea 17 (2010)
 United States Wins the World Cup (2014)

Discography

Albums
 It Took Several Wives (1982, Family Friend Records) as Bohack
 The Way It Is Soundtrack (1984, Rojo Records)
 Buffalo '66 Soundtrack (1998, Will Records)
 When (2001, Warp Records)
 Recordings of Music for Film (2002, Warp Records)

EPs
 So Sad (2001, Warp Records)

Singles
 Honey Bunny (2001, Warp Records)

Awards and nominations

References

External links

 
 

1961 births
Living people
American alternative rock musicians
American male film actors
Film directors from New York (state)
Male models from New York (state)
Male actors from Buffalo, New York
Volpi Cup for Best Actor winners
Warp (record label) artists
20th-century American male actors
21st-century American male actors
American people of Italian descent